Lorenzo Musetti (born 3 March 2002) is an Italian professional tennis player. He has a career-high singles ATP ranking of World No. 18 achieved on 30 January 2023 and a doubles ranking of World No. 283 achieved on 2 May 2022. Musetti has won two ATP Tour singles titles.

As a junior, Musetti was ranked as high as world No. 1, reaching the final of the 2018 US Open boys' singles and winning the 2019 Australian Open boys' title. Since turning professional in 2019, he has won two titles on the ITF World Tennis Tour and two ATP Challenger titles. Musetti trains at La Spezia TC and Tirrenia.

Early life
Lorenzo Musetti was born on March 3, 2002, in Carrara, Tuscany, Italy. His father Francesco is a marble producer, and his mother Sabrina is a secretary. He began playing tennis at age 4, and has been coached by Simone Tartarini since childhood. His tennis idol growing up was Roger Federer.

Professional career

Juniors
He has achieved a career-high ITF juniors ranking of 1 in the world on 10 June 2019. On 26 January 2019 Musetti defeated Emilio Nava to win the 2019 Australian Open boys' singles title.

2020: ATP debut
After receiving a wildcard and passing the qualifying, he made his ATP Tour main draw debut in February 2020 at the Dubai Tennis Championships, at the age of 17, where he lost in the first round against Andrey Rublev.

His second main draw tour-level match and first on a Masters 1000 level in his career came after qualifying at the Italian Open, where he defeated three-time Grand Slam champion Stan Wawrinka in straight sets in the first round, becoming the first player born in 2002 to win an ATP match, and former World No. 4 Kei Nishikori in the second round. In October he received a wildcard for the Forte Village Sardegna Open, where he reached his first ATP semifinal, retiring due to an injury against eventual champion Laslo Đere after trailing 1–4 in the third set.

2021: Top 100, ATP 500 semifinal, Grand Slam debut and fourth round
Musetti was the youngest player to break into the top 100 for the first time in his career by reaching the semifinals of the ATP Tour 500 Mexican Open tournament in March after going through qualifying. There he had his first top 10 win against world no. 9 Diego Schwartzman in three sets. He also beat Frances Tiafoe and 5th-seed Grigor Dimitrov to break into the top 100 and reach his second ATP semifinal, and first at a 500 level, where he was defeated in straight sets by Stefanos Tsitsipas. The 19-year-old was the third-youngest semifinalist in the tournament's history. Only Xavier Malisse (1998) and Rafael Nadal (2005) reached the final four in Acapulco at a younger age.

Musetti reached his third ATP semifinal at the Lyon Open in May, where he was again defeated by Tsitsipas.

He capped off the clay season by reaching the fourth round at the French Open, on his Grand Slam championship debut (only the sixth player since 2000 to do so), beating 13th seed David Goffin, Yoshihito Nishioka and Marco Cecchinato in his first five-set match. He had a 2-0 lead in sets against top seed Novak Djokovic in the fourth round, but retired in the 5th set trailing 0-4. As a result of this successful run, he climbed to his best ranking of World No. 57 on 13 September 2021.

At the end of the season, he took part in the Next Generation ATP Finals, where he was eliminated in the round robin stage as third of his group, having lost to Sebastián Báez and finalist Sebastian Korda, and won to Hugo Gaston.

2022: First two ATP titles, top 25, Masters quarterfinal

At the beginning of the season, Musetti reached the quarter-finals at the ATP 500 Rotterdam Open, losing against Jiří Lehečka after having defeated No. 11 Hubert Hurkacz in the second round. In Monte Carlo, he recorded the second top 10 win of his career by defeating world number 9 Félix Auger-Aliassime in the second round.

After reaching his fourth career tour-level semifinal at the 2022 Hamburg European Open with a win over Alejandro Davidovich Fokina, he made his top 50 debut in the rankings. He defeated Francisco Cerúndolo in the semifinals to reach the first ATP final of his career. He triumphed over World No. 6 and top seed Carlos Alcaraz in the final, winning his first ATP title and first ATP 500 tournament. As a result, he climbed up the rankings to world No. 31 on 25 July 2022. Following the title, Musetti made his top 30 debut at world No. 30 on 1 August, after winning his opening round at the Croatia Open.

At the US Open, where Musetti was seeded for the first time at a grand slam, he reached the third round, his deepest run in a grand slam since the 2021 French Open. In the first round, he defeated former world number 7 David Goffin in a five set match, decided by a fifth-set tiebreak. He then defeated Gijs Brouwer, but lost to Ilya Ivashka in four sets. 

In the fall, Musetti reached his fifth and sixth ATP semifinals at the consecutive Sofia Open and Firenze Open tournaments, where he was defeated in both cases by eventual champions Marc-Andrea Huesler and Félix Auger-Aliassime. He then won his second career title at the Tennis Napoli Cup, defeating fellow countryman Matteo Berrettini in the final. Following the title, he reached a career-high ranking of No. 23 on 24 October 2022. 

At the 2022 Paris Masters, Musetti reached the quarterfinals of a Masters 1000 for the first time in his career. He defeated former world No. 3 Marin Cilic, Nikoloz Basilashvili, and world No. 4 Casper Ruud for his biggest and first top-5 win, but lost to Novak Djokovic.
Musetti's final ATP tournament of the year was the Next Generation ATP Finals, where he was eliminated in the round-robin stage after beating Tseng Chun-hsin, but losing to Dominic Stricker and Jack Draper.

2023: Top 20 debut
At the United Cup, Musetti helped Italy reach the final after going 4–1 in his singles matches; he retired after the first set in his match against Frances Tiafoe due to a shoulder injury. After this, he reached the top 20 at world No. 19 on 9 January 2023. Musetti was upset in the first round of the Australian Open by Lloyd Harris in five sets, however, he jumped one spot to a career-high of No. 18 in the rankings following the tournament.

Performance timeline

Singles
Current through 2023 Australian Open.

Doubles

ATP career finals

Singles: 2 (2 titles)

Record against other players

Record against top 10 players
Musetti's record against players who have been ranked in the top 10, with those who are active in boldface. Only ATP Tour main draw matches are considered:

Record against players ranked No. 11–20
Active players are in boldface. 

  Benoît Paire 2–0
  Pablo Cuevas 1–0
  Feliciano López 1–0
  Frances Tiafoe 1–1
  Nikoloz Basilashvili 1–1
  Marco Cecchinato 1–1
  Albert Ramos Viñolas 1–2
  Borna Ćorić 0–1
  Alex de Minaur 0–1
  Aslan Karatsev 0–1
  Reilly Opelka 0–3

*

Wins over top 10 players
He has a  record against players who were, at the time the match was played, ranked in the top 10.

Challenger and Futures finals

Singles: 6 (4 titles, 2 runner-ups)

Junior Grand Slam finals

Singles: 2 (1 title)

References

External links 

 
 

2002 births
Living people
Italian male tennis players
Australian Open (tennis) junior champions
People from Carrara
Tennis players at the 2018 Summer Youth Olympics
Grand Slam (tennis) champions in boys' singles
Tennis players at the 2020 Summer Olympics
Olympic tennis players of Italy
Sportspeople from the Province of Massa-Carrara
21st-century Italian people